Temperate deciduous or temperate broad-leaf forests are a variety of temperate forest 'dominated' by trees that lose their leaves each year.  They are found in areas with warm moist summers and cool winters. The six major areas of this forest type occur in the Northern Hemisphere: North America, East Asia, Central and Western Europe (except Brittany, Cornwall, Wales, Ireland and western Scotland), northern Spain, Denmark, southern Sweden, southern Norway and in the southern hemisphere in Patagonia (Chile and Argentina). Temperate evergreen forests occur in Australasia, New Zealand and southern South America (except for some areas in Chile and Argentina where there are deciduous forests), they are not deciduous as their northern-hemisphere equivalents. Examples of typical trees in the Northern Hemisphere's deciduous forests include oak, maple, basswood, beech and elm, while in the Southern Hemisphere, trees of the genus Nothofagus dominate this type of forest. They are also bound to receive heavy rainfall.

Resources 

Humans have often colonised areas in the temperate deciduous forest. They have harvested wood for timber and charcoal. During the European colonization of North America, potash made from tree ashes was exported back to Europe as fertilizer. This left less than one-quarter of original forests remaining. Many forests are now small fragments dissected by fields and roads; these islands of green often differ substantially from the original forests, particularly along the edges. The introduction of exotic diseases continues to be a threat to forest trees, and hence, the forest; examples include the loss of chestnut and elm.  At the same time, species such as deer, which are clearing rather than true forest animals, have expanded their range and proliferated in these altered landscapes.  Large deer populations have deleterious effects on tree regeneration overall, but particularly for edible species including yew, yellow birch, and hemlock.  Deer grazing also has significant negative effects on the number and kind of herbaceous flowering plants. The continuing pressure to increase deer populations, and the continued killing of top carnivores, suggests that overgrazing by deer will continue.

Gallery

See also
 Temperate coniferous forest
 Temperate broadleaf and mixed forest
 International Year of Forests
 Old-growth forest
Tropical evergreen forest
Tropical deciduous forest

References

External links 
 A map of biome distribution (Temperate Deciduous Forest is in dark green)

 Deciduous
Terrestrial biomes
Forests
Habitat